The 1954 United States Senate election in Massachusetts was held on November 2, 1954, with Republican Incumbent Leverett Saltonstall defeating his challengers.

Republican primary

Candidates
Leverett Saltonstall, incumbent Senator since 1945

Results
Senator Saltonstall was unopposed for re-nomination.

Democratic primary

Candidates
 Foster Furcolo, Treasurer and Receiver-General of Massachusetts since 1952
 John I. Fitzgerald, former member of the Boston City Council and candidate for Senate in 1948
 Joseph L. Murphy, former State Senator

Results

General election

Candidates
 Foster Furcolo, Treasurer and Receiver-General of Massachusetts since 1952 (Democratic)
 Thelma Ingersoll, candidate for Senate in 1952 (Socialist Workers)
 Harold J. Ireland, candidate for Treasurer and Receiver-General in 1948 and 1952 (Prohibition)
Leverett Saltonstall, incumbent Senator since 1945 (Republican)

Results

References

Massachusetts
1954
1954 Massachusetts elections